Mickle Trafford is a former civil parish, now in the parish of Mickle Trafford and District, in Cheshire West and Chester, England.  It contains eleven buildings that are recorded in the National Heritage List for England as designated listed buildings.  Of these, one is listed at Grade I, the highest grade, one is listed at Grade II*, the middle grade, and the others are at Grade II.  Apart from the village of Mickle Trafford, the parish is rural.  In addition to houses and buildings related to farming, the listed buildings include a medieval church and associated structures, an inscribed stone, and a corn mill.

Key

Buildings

See also
 Listed buildings in Backford
 Listed buildings in Barrow
 Listed buildings in Dunham-on-the-Hill
 Listed buildings in Guilden Sutton
 Listed buildings in Hoole Village
 Listed buildings in Thornton-le-Moors
 Listed buildings in Upton-by-Chester
 Listed buildings in Wervin
 Listed buildings in Wimbolds Trafford

References
Citations

Sources

Listed buildings in Cheshire West and Chester
Lists of listed buildings in Cheshire